The Presidium of the People's Chamber was a group of members of the People's Chamber responsible for conducting its activities.

It consisted of representatives of  parties and mass organizations, represented in the People's Chamber. The presidium was headed by the President of the People's Chamber.

1. Legislative Session (1950–1954)

2. Legislative Session (1954–1958)

3. Legislative Session (1958–1963)

4. Legislative Session (1963–1967)

5. Legislative Session (1967–1971)

7. Legislative Session (1971–1976)

8. Legislative Session (1976–1981)

8. Legislative Session (1981–1986)

9. Legislative Session (1986–1990)

First Presidium (1986–1989)

Second Presidium (1989–1990)

10. Legislative Session (1990)

Sources

Volkskammer
Politics of East Germany
Volkskammer